Jean-Claude Abric (26 September 1941 – 13 September 2012) was a French psychologist, professor in social psychology and the former head of the Social Psychology Laboratory at the University of Aix-Marseille.

He had a major contribution to the theory of social representation identifying the structural elements of a social representation and distinguishing the core elements from the peripheral ones. 
His first study on social representations was based on craftsmen and craft industry. In his book published in 1994, he gives a broader vision of his Central Nucleus Theory. 

He also published handbooks on the psychology of communication.

References

2012 deaths
1941 births
French psychologists
Scientists from Toulon
Academic staff of Aix-Marseille University